Forgetting to Know You is a 2013 Chinese drama film written and directed by Quan Ling. It was Quan's directorial debut. The film debuted at the 2013 63rd Berlin International Film Festival, but was not released domestically until August 29, 2014.

The film is set and filmed in Baisha (白沙), a suburban town in Jiangjin District, Chongqing. The Chinese title used at Berlin International Film Festival was Mosheng (陌生; "Unfamiliar"), but it was later changed to match the English title's meaning.

Cast
 Tao Hong as Chen Xuesong, who runs a corner shop
 Guo Xiaodong as Cai Weihang, Chen's carpenter husband who wants to start a furniture business
 Zhang Wan as Yuanyuan, Chen and Cai's young daughter
 Wang Ziyi as Wu Junyan, a taxi driver who likes Chen
 Zhang Yibai as Yang Jiucheng, rich and famous man who was once friends with Chen

Plot
The film deals with a normal working-class couple, whose relationship deteriorates under stress due to lack of trust and communication.

Reception
David Rooney of The Hollywood Reporter praised Quan's rookie efforts as "nuanced", adding that "Tao’s performance in the central role alone makes it captivating". Derek Elley of Film Business Asia rated it 7 out of 10 and states "the film is made engrossing by its two lead actors... (Tao) simply gets better and better with age, drawing a subtle portrait of a bored wife who still longs for more than she's ended up with: tiny details in costuming, gestures and looks make this a performance that could so easily have been over-ripe."

Awards

References

External links
 Trailer with English subtitles
 
 

Chinese drama films
2013 drama films
2013 directorial debut films
2013 films
Films set in Chongqing
Films shot in Chongqing